Mermaid Beach is a coastal suburb on the Gold Coast in Queensland, Australia.

Nobby Beach is a neighbourhood in the south of the suburb.

Geography 

The suburb is bounded to the west by the artificial canals of adjacent Mermaid Waters and to the east by the Pacific Ocean. To the north is the suburb of Broadbeach, to the south Miami. The Gold Coast Highway passes through Mermaid Beach.

The Gold Coast Oceanway (a pedestrian path) travels along Hedges Avenue.

History 

Mermaid Beach receives its name from the cutter HMS Mermaid. Explorer John Oxley sailed aboard the Mermaid in 1823 when he discovered the nearby Tweed and Brisbane rivers.

Mermaid Beach was used during World War II by US servicemen, and was named Los Angeles Beach as well as Miami Beach to the south.

Circa 1924, 70 allotments were advertised as "Mermaid Beach Estate" located at Mermaid Beach and Broadbeach to be auctioned by R. G. Oates Estates. The estate map has 3 estates for sale at Mermaid Beach and Broadbeach. The estates were divided in two by the "New Coastal Road" running through the Gold Coast.

Magic Mountain, Nobby Beach opened up in 1962

St James' Anglican Church was dedicated on 11 November 1977 by Assistant Bishop Ralph Wicks. Its closure on 15 August 1993 was approved by Assistant Bishop Ron Williams.

Education 
There are no schools in Mermaid Beach but there are primary schools in neighbouring Broadbeach and Mermaid Waters and a secondary school in Mermaid Waters.

Amenities 
The Mermaid Beach branch of the Queensland Country Women's Association meets at QCWA Hall at 43 Ventura Road.

Other community groups include:
 Mermaid Beach Surf Life Saving Club
 Nobby Beach Surf Life Saving Club

References

External links
 

Suburbs of the Gold Coast, Queensland
Beaches of Queensland
Queensland in World War II